Daulatpur (Urdu:دولت پور) is a village and union council of Jhelum District in the Punjab Province of Pakistan. It is part of Pind Dadan Khan Tehsil. It is located approximately four kilometers away from the Pind Dadan Khan-Jhelum Road on the north side of Pinanwal. The population of this village is approximately 4000.

Health facilities 
A Government dispensary and a civil veterinary hospital are there.

Villages of Filed Office 
Chak Danial

Chak Jani

Nathial  

Chakri

Mirza Abad

Gahora 

Thill.

Education Facilities 
It has a primary school for boys and an English-medium Girls' High school.
The existence of this village is believed to be prior to "Alexander" era. Earlier it was situated along with the mountains, now approximately 2 kilometres away from the village. Remains of the settlement are found in the hilly terrain of the village. As the river (Jhelum) changed its route, village was believed to move as well. Pre-partition population of the village was equally divided between Muslims and Hindus. A few Sikh families were also settled here. The ancient part of village also contained a Hindu Temple.

Other Facilities 
The major occupations of this village are agriculture and livestock farming. It has a good literacy rate. It has two Jamia Mosques,  Gulzar-e-Madina and Gulzar-e-Habib, and five other Mosques.

References

Populated places in Tehsil Pind Dadan Khan
Union councils of Pind Dadan Khan Tehsil